The Royal Historical Society, founded in 1868, is a learned society of the United Kingdom which advances scholarly studies of history.

Origins
The society was founded and received its royal charter in 1868. Until 1872 it was known as the Historical Society. In 1897, it merged with (or absorbed) the Camden Society, founded in 1838. In its origins, and for many years afterwards, the society was effectively a gentlemen's club. However, in the middle and later twentieth century the RHS took on a more active role in representing the discipline and profession of history.

Current activities
The society exists to promote historical research in the United Kingdom and worldwide, representing historians of all kinds. Its activities primarily concern advocacy and policy research, training, publishing, grants and research support, especially for early career historians, and awards and professional recognition. It provides a varied programme of lectures and one-day and two-day conferences and symposia covering diverse historical topics. It convenes in London and from time to time elsewhere throughout the United Kingdom. Since 1967 it has been based at University College London.

Governance
The society is governed by a board of trustees called the council, which is chaired by the RHS President. The president and members of council are elected from the society's fellows. There are 22 councillors, each of whom serves a four-year term. Every year the fellowship elects three new members of council using a preferential voting system. Council members come from a wide variety of backgrounds and research interests.

Fellows and members
The society's membership comprises honorary vice-presidents (management), elected fellows (entitled to use FRHistS as post-nominal letters), associate fellows, and members. 

Fellowships are awarded to those who have made an original contribution to historical scholarship, typically through the authorship of a book, a body of scholarly work similar in scale and impact to a book, the organisation of exhibitions and conferences, the editing of journals, and other works of diffusion and dissemination grounded in historical research. Election is conducted by review and applications must be supported by someone who is already a Fellow. A list of current fellows and members is maintained online by the RHS.

Publications
The society's publications include its monographic series Studies in History (1975–2020) and New Historical Perspectives (2016–), its annual Transactions (first published as Transactions of the Historical Society, 1872), and the Camden Series of editions and translations of texts; as well as digital publications, such as the Bibliography of British and Irish History.

The society runs an active open-access online blog, entitled Historical Transactions. It was established in 2018 as part of the commemoration of the Royal Historical Society’s 150th Anniversary.

Prizes
The regular prizes, awards and recognitions granted by the society include:
 The Gladstone Prize
 The Whitfield Prize

List of presidents
The presidents of the society have been:

See also

The Historical Association 
List of British professional bodies
List of Royal Societies
Historiography of the United Kingdom

References

Bibliography

External links

 
1868 establishments in the United Kingdom
1868 establishments in England
Organizations established in 1868
History organisations based in London
History organisations based in the United Kingdom
Historical societies of the United Kingdom
Historical
Social history of the United Kingdom
Learned societies of the United Kingdom
Organisations based in London with royal patronage
Organisations based in the London Borough of Camden
Historical societies